Jason Edward Gamble (born September 12, 1975) is a former Arena Football League offensive lineman/defensive lineman for the Grand Rapids Rampage (2003–2005) and the Georgia Force (2006).

Early years
Gamble attended Derby High School in Derby, Kansas, and was a letterwinner in football and wrestling.

College career
Gamble attended Hutchinson Community College in Hutchinson, Kansas for two years. As a sophomore, he was a Junior College All-American and the Jayhawk Conference Offensive Lineman of the Year.

Gamble attended Clemson University and was a two-year starter at center on the football team. As a senior, he won All-ACC honorable mention honors. After his senior year, he was selected to participate in the Senior Bowl and the East-West Shrine Game.

External links
 Orlando Rage bio
 Stats from arenafan.com

1975 births
Living people
American football offensive linemen
American football defensive linemen
Clemson Tigers football players
Georgia Force players
Grand Rapids Rampage players
Hutchinson Blue Dragons football players
Orlando Rage players
People from Derby, Kansas
Players of American football from Columbus, Ohio
Scottish Claymores players